Stamna is a village and a community in the municipal unit of Aitoliko in the southern part of Aetolia-Acarnania, Greece. It is located on a chain of low hills that separate the river Acheloos to the west from the bay of Aitoliko to the southeast. It is 6 km south of Angelokastro, 11 km northwest of Aitoliko, 17 km southwest of Agrinio and 21 km northwest of Missolonghi. The Ionia Odos motorway (Missolonghi - Amfilochia) passes east of the village. The community Stamna consists of the villages Stamna, Stathmos Stamnas (1.5 km east, near the former railway station) and Kefalovrysos (4 km southeast, at the bay). Stamna had a train station on the former railway from Missolonghi to Agrinio.

Historical population

See also
List of settlements in Aetolia-Acarnania

References

External links
Official site
Stamna Forum

Populated places in Aetolia-Acarnania